Teng Rujun (also credited as Ten Rujun) is a Chinese actor. He has appeared in Zhang Yimou's Red Sorghum and Huo Jianqi's Postmen in the Mountains.

External links

Chinese male film actors
Chinese male television actors
Living people
Year of birth missing (living people)
Place of birth missing (living people)
20th-century Chinese male actors